"Money Is Not Our God" is Killing Joke's second and only official single from their eighth studio album, Extremities, Dirt & Various Repressed Emotions. It was released only in Germany on 3 January 1991 by the Aggressive Rockproduktionen label on 12" vinyl and as a CD mini single, both backed by B-side "North of the Border".

"Money Is Not Our God" failed to chart on the UK Singles Chart.

Reception 
Reception for "Money Is Not Our God" was generally positive. Ned Raggett of Allmusic praised Geordie Walker's guitar performance as "better than ever" and the song itself "rips along with the sheer fire of 1980 intact."  He credited Coleman's vocals as an "opening rampage" and that the group "collectively allows for the later abilities of the members and incorporates that into the performances."

Track listings

12" single 
Side A
"Money Is Not Our God" – 05:12

Side B
"North of the Border" – 05:50

CD mini single 
Side A
"Money Is Not Our God" – 05:12
"North of the Border" – 05:50

References

External links 
 

1990 songs
Killing Joke songs
Songs written by Youth (musician)
Songs written by Geordie Walker
Songs written by Jaz Coleman